The GRADE approach (Grading of Recommendations Assessment, Development and Evaluation) is a method of assessing the certainty in evidence (also known as quality of evidence or confidence in effect estimates) and the strength of recommendations in health care. It provides a structured and transparent evaluation of the importance of outcomes of alternative management strategies, acknowledgment of patients and the public values and preferences, and comprehensive criteria for downgrading and upgrading certainty in evidence. It has important implications for those summarizing evidence for systematic reviews, health technology assessments, and clinical practice guidelines as well as other decision makers.

However, when used to summarize evidence from nutritional science, dietary, lifestyle and environmental exposure the use of the GRADE approach has been criticized. That is because the GRADE system only allows for randomized controlled trials (RCT) to be rated as high evidence and rates all observational studies as low evidence because of their potential of confounding. This dismisses the strength of observational studies when it comes to long-term effects of dietary and lifestyle factors and does not reflect the key limitations that RCTs have when it comes to long-term effects. One example of a slowly progressing disease that should preferably be studied with observational studies but not RCTs is atherosclerosis.

Background and history
The GRADE began in the year 2000 as a collaboration of methodologists, guideline developers, biostatisticians, clinicians, public health scientists and other interested members. GRADE developed and implemented a common, transparent and sensible approach to grading the quality of evidence (also known as certainty in evidence or confidence in effect estimates) and strength of recommendations in healthcare.

GRADE components
The GRADE approach separates recommendations following from an evaluation of the evidence as strong or weak. A recommendation to use, or not use an option (e.g. an intervention), should be based on the trade-offs between desirable consequences of following a recommendation on the one hand, and undesirable consequences on the other. If desirable consequences outweigh undesirable consequences, decision makers will recommend an option and vice versa. The uncertainty associated with the trade-off between the desirable and undesirable consequences will determine the strength of recommendations. The criteria that determine this balance of consequences are listed in Table 2. Furthermore, it provides decision-makers (e.g. clinicians, other health care providers, patients and policy makers) with a guide to using those recommendations in clinical practice, public health and policy. To achieve simplicity, the GRADE approach classifies the quality of evidence in one of four levels—high, moderate, low, and very low:

Quality of evidence
GRADE rates quality of evidence as follows:

The GRADE working group has developed a software application that facilitates the use of the approach, allows the development of summary tables and contains the GRADE handbook. The software is free for non-profit organizations and is available online.
The GRADE approach to assess the certainty in evidence is widely applicable, including to questions about diagnosis, prognosis, network meta-analysis and public health.

Strength of recommendation
Factors and criteria that determine the direction and strength of a recommendation:

 Factors for which overlap is described are often not shown separately in a decision table.

Usage
Over 100 organizations (including the World Health Organization, the UK National Institute for Health and Care Excellence (NICE), the Canadian Task Force for Preventive Health Care, the Colombian Ministry of Health and Social Protection, and the Saudi Arabian Ministry of Health) have endorsed and/or are using GRADE to evaluate the quality of evidence and strength of health care recommendations.

References

Educational assessment and evaluation